The Memorial Bridge is a bascule bridge over the Chao Phraya River in Bangkok, Thailand, connecting the districts of Phra Nakhon and Thonburi.

History
The bridge opened on 6 April 1932, by King Prajadhipok (Rama VII) in commemoration of the 150th anniversary of the Chakri dynasty and the foundation of Bangkok, shortly before the Siamese coup d'état of 24 June 1932. In English the bridge is commonly known as Memorial Bridge, however in Thai, it is most commonly known as Phra Phuttayotfa Bridge (สะพานพระพุทธยอดฟ้า), after King Phutthayotfa Chulalok (Rama I), the first king of the Chakri dynasty. The name is more commonly shortened as Saphan Phut (สะพานพุทธ) or Phut Bridge or Buddha Bridge (meaning: Bridge of Buddha).

Construction of the bridge was started on 3 December 1929 by Dorman Long, Middlesbrough, England, under the supervision of Italian technicians from SNOS (Società Nazionale Officine Savignano). The bridge used to have a double-leaf bascule-type lifting mechanism, which is now unused.

On 5 June 1944, as part of the bombing of Bangkok in World War II, a force of B-29 Superfortresses, in a test of their capabilities before being deployed against the Japanese home islands, targeted the bridge. Their bombs fell over two kilometers away, damaging no civilian structures, but downed some tram lines and destroyed a Japanese military hospital and the Japanese secret police headquarters. It was not until 1947 that Thai authorities learned of the intended target.  Eventually, it was taken out by the Allies and rebuilt in 1949.

Gallery

References

External links

 

Road bridges in Bangkok
Bridges completed in 1932
Crossings of the Chao Phraya River
Phra Nakhon district
Bascule bridges
1932 establishments in Siam
Unregistered ancient monuments in Bangkok